The 2008 European Drift Championship season is the second season of the European Drift Championship. The championship was won by Ben Broke-Smith.

2008 entry list

Entrants 1-17
Kumakubo 
Coyne Brothers 
Armstrong 
Tanaka 
More entrants will be added throughout the season including British Drift Championship Wildcard Entries.
Round 2 wildcard - Mike Gaynor

2008 Rounds 
Round 1 - April 5/6th - Donington Park
Round 2 - May 17/18th Knockhill Circuit
Round 3 - June 1 Silverstone Circuit
Round 4 - July 11/12th - Santa Pod Raceway
Round 5 - September 6/7th Silverstone Circuit
Round 6 - September 26/27th - Poznan Circuit, Poland

European Drift Championship